Hamden is an unincorporated community located within Clinton Township, in Hunterdon County, New Jersey, United States.

History

The  Hamden Tract was purchased by Phillip and John Grandin in 1759. The Grandin Grist & Fulling-Mills, a blacksmith shop, and Abbott's Tavern were located here. The farmhouse of Jacob Gearhart (1735–1813), captain in the American Revolutionary War, is located nearby.  The 1858 Fink-Type Truss Bridge (Hamden Bridge), listed on the National Register of Historic Places, crossed the river here, until it collapsed in 1978.

References

Clinton Township, New Jersey
Unincorporated communities in Hunterdon County, New Jersey
Unincorporated communities in New Jersey